Esequiel Coronel (born April 5, 2003) is an American professional soccer player who plays as a midfielder for USL Championship side Real Monarchs.

Club career
Born in Las Vegas, Nevada, Coronel joined the academy at Real Salt Lake in 2019. He made his professional debut for the club's reserve team, Real Monarchs, on October 4, 2020 against El Paso Locomotive. He came on as a 59th minute substitute for Bode Davis as Real Monarchs were defeated 0–4.

Career statistics

Club

References

2003 births
Living people
People from Las Vegas
American soccer players
Association football midfielders
Real Monarchs players
USL Championship players
Soccer players from Las Vegas